Antipodia is a genus of skipper butterflies in the family Hesperiidae.

Species
Antipodia atralba Tepper, 1882
Antipodia chaostola Meyrick, 1888
Antipodia dactyliota Meyrick, 1888

References
Natural History Museum Lepidoptera genus database
Antipodia at funet

Trapezitinae
Hesperiidae genera